The Senate (  or simply  , literally "First Chamber of the States General", or sometimes  ) is the upper house of the States General, the legislature of the Netherlands. Its 75 members are elected on lists by the members of the twelve States-Provincial and four electoral colleges for the Senate every four years, within three months of the provincial elections. All provinces and colleges have different electoral weight depending on their population.

Members of the Senate tend to be veteran or part-time politicians at the national level, often having other roles. They receive an allowance which is about a quarter of the salary of the members of the lower house. Unlike the politically more significant House of Representatives, it meets only once a week.

It has the right to accept or reject legislative proposals but not to amend them or to initiate legislation. Directly after a bill has been passed by the House of Representatives, it is sent to the Senate and is submitted to a parliamentary committee. The committee decides whether the bill can be immediately put on the agenda of the full chamber or if there should first be preparatory study of the bill. If a bill is immediately put on the agenda of the full chamber, it is passed as a formality without a debate.

Name
Although this body is called the "Senate" in English, this is not a direct translation of its official Dutch name, the "First Chamber of the States General" or, in short, the "First Chamber". Nevertheless, and in contrast to the Second Chamber, the name Senaat is also used often in the media. "Member of the First Chamber" (Eerste Kamerlid), "member of the Senate" (senaatslid) or "senator" (senator) are used, although the first one is the official and most used term.

History

The first constitution of the modern Netherlands, passed in 1814, re-established a unicameral States General. As it became clear that the former Southern Netherlands would be added to the new United Kingdom of the Netherlands, a newly instituted constitutional commission was tasked with drafting a new constitution. The southern members of the constitutional commission pressed for a  bicameral system because of the conviction that their nobility should be given a place in the legislature. While the northern members were not enthusiastic about the proposal, they agreed under the condition that nobility would not be a requirement for membership. The new constitution, which came into effect on 24 August 1815, thus provided for a Senate consisting of forty to sixty members appointed by the king for life. The list of the first appointees was published on 16 September 1815 and the newly appointed chamber was first assembled on 21 September 1815 in Brussels in a joint assembly with the House of Representatives. In its early years, the Senate functioned as a bulwark of the Crown (the king and his ministers). Its members, appointed by the king from among the "most significant of the country", were mostly confidants of the king who were often called upon to veto bills that displeased him. Such bills were usually private members' bills from the House of Representatives. The Senate remained in existence after the independence of Belgium in 1830, although its membership was halved to no fewer than twenty and no more than thirty members.

Much changed in the political sphere as a result of the Constitutional Reform of 1848, which introduced direct elections for the House of Representatives, which until then had been elected by the States-Provincial. The constitutional commission, under the chairmanship of Johan Rudolph Thorbecke, intended for the Senate to be directly elected as well, but the predominantly conservative House of Representatives blocked this, fearing that the two chambers would be too similar. Additionally, senators were expected to judge bills with more independence and distance from daily politics, as a "chambre de reflection", which was deemed impossible when they would be forced to campaign for direct election.

It was therefore decided that the Senate would henceforth be elected by the States-Provincial. Its 39 seats were distributed among the provinces degressively proportional to population, and a third of its members would be elected for 9-year terms every three years using a majoritarian system. The position of the Senate and the criteria governing eligibility to stand for election were also among the changes. Monitoring the quality of legislation gradually came to be the main function of the Senate after 1848.

The existence and functioning of the Senate have been criticised throughout history, manifested in reports of state commissions, government proposals and private bills calling for reform or abolition of the Senate. Abolition of the Senate was attempted by social democrats and progressive liberals in 1903, and again after World War I, but these proposals could not count on sufficient support.

However, reform came in 1922, five years after a constitutional amendment that introduced universal male suffrage and proportional representation to the House of Representatives. The constitutional amendment of 1922 brought proportional representation to the Senate as well. Rather than the seats being distributed among the provinces, the provinces were now organised into four groups of roughly equal population, each electing twelve or thirteen senators under party-list proportional representation. The term of senators was decreased to six years, with two of the four groups electing their senators every three years. The number of senators was increased from 50 to 75 in 1956, and the distribution of seats among groups of provinces was adapted to account for changes in population distribution.

The Senate was subjected to another reform in 1983. The term of senators was further reduced to four years, equal to that of Representatives. The system of groups of provinces and staggered elections was abolished in favour of quadrennial elections for the entire Senate in one nationwide constituency. Several minor changes have since been adopted. In 2010, the possibility for party lists to enter into an electoral alliance was abolished, and the number of preference votes needed for a candidate to be elected was increased from 50% to 100% of the quota.

The establishment of the three electoral colleges for the Caribbean Netherlands was made possible by the constitutional amendment of 2017. The members of the Caribbean electoral colleges were elected for the first time on March 20, 2019. Citizens of Bonaire, Sint Eustatius and Saba with Dutch nationality are entitled to vote. The establishment of a non-resident electoral college was made possible by the 2022 constitutional amendment.

Parliamentary leaders

Members of the Presidium

Elections and membership

Electoral system

The 75 senators are elected every four years by the members of the States-Provincial of the country's twelve provinces and (since 2019) by electoral colleges elected in the Caribbean Netherlands. The seats are distributed in one nationwide constituency using party-list proportional representation. Remainder seats are distributed using the highest averages method. The weight of a member's vote is determined by the population of the province in which the voter is a member of the States-Provincial, at a ratio of approximately 1 vote per 100 residents. The table below shows the weight of members' votes per province as of the 2019 election.

Historic composition

|-
! style="background-color:#E9E9E9;text-align:left;vertical-align:top;" |Parties
! style="background-color:#E9E9E9;text-align:right;vertical-align:top;" |Seats 2019
! style="background-color:#E9E9E9;text-align:right;vertical-align:top;" |Seats 2015
! style="background-color:#E9E9E9;text-align:right;vertical-align:top;" |Seats 2011
! style="background-color:#E9E9E9;text-align:right;vertical-align:top;" |Seats 2007
! style="background-color:#E9E9E9;text-align:right;vertical-align:top;" |Seats 2003
! style="background-color:#E9E9E9;text-align:right;vertical-align:top;" |Seats 1999
! style="background-color:#E9E9E9;text-align:right;vertical-align:top;" |Seats 1995
! style="background-color:#E9E9E9;text-align:right;vertical-align:top;" |Seats 1991
|-
| style="text-align:left;" |Forum for Democracy (FVD)
| style="text-align:right;" |12
| style="text-align:right;" |
| style="text-align:right;" |
| style="text-align:right;" |
| style="text-align:right;" |
| style="text-align:right;" |
| style="text-align:right;" |
| style="text-align:right;" |
|-
| style="text-align:left;" |People's Party for Freedom and Democracy (VVD)
| style="text-align:right;" |12
| style="text-align:right;" |13
| style="text-align:right;" |16
| style="text-align:right;" |14
| style="text-align:right;" |15
| style="text-align:right;" |19
| style="text-align:right;" |23
| style="text-align:right;" |12
|-
| style="text-align:left;" |Christian Democratic Appeal (CDA)
| style="text-align:right;" |9
| style="text-align:right;" |12
| style="text-align:right;" |11
| style="text-align:right;" |21
| style="text-align:right;" |23
| style="text-align:right;" |20
| style="text-align:right;" |19
| style="text-align:right;" |27
|-
| style="text-align:left;" |GreenLeft (GL)
| style="text-align:right;" |8
| style="text-align:right;" |4
| style="text-align:right;" |5
| style="text-align:right;" |4
| style="text-align:right;" |5
| style="text-align:right;" |8
| style="text-align:right;" |4
| style="text-align:right;" |4
|-
| style="text-align:left;" |Democrats 66 (D66)
| style="text-align:right;" |7
| style="text-align:right;" |10
| style="text-align:right;" |5
| style="text-align:right;" |2
| style="text-align:right;" |3
| style="text-align:right;" |4
| style="text-align:right;" |7
| style="text-align:right;" |12
|-
| style="text-align:left;" |Labour Party (PvdA)
| style="text-align:right;" |6
| style="text-align:right;" |8
| style="text-align:right;" |14
| style="text-align:right;" |14
| style="text-align:right;" |19
| style="text-align:right;" |15
| style="text-align:right;" |14
| style="text-align:right;" |16
|-
| style="text-align:left;" |Party for Freedom (PVV)
| style="text-align:right;" |5
| style="text-align:right;" |9
| style="text-align:right;" |10
| style="text-align:right;" |
| style="text-align:right;" |
| style="text-align:right;" |
| style="text-align:right;" |
| style="text-align:right;" |
|-
| style="text-align:left;" |Socialist Party (SP)
| style="text-align:right;" |4
| style="text-align:right;" |9
| style="text-align:right;" |8
| style="text-align:right;" |12
| style="text-align:right;" |4
| style="text-align:right;" |2
| style="text-align:right;" |1
| style="text-align:right;" |
|-
| style="text-align:left;" |Christian Union (CU)
| style="text-align:right;" |4
| style="text-align:right;" |3
| style="text-align:right;" |2
| style="text-align:right;" |4
| style="text-align:right;" |2
| style="text-align:right;" |4
| style="text-align:right;" |2*
| style="text-align:right;" |2*
|-
| style="text-align:left;" |Party for the Animals (PvdD)
| style="text-align:right;" |3
| style="text-align:right;" |2
| style="text-align:right;" |1
| style="text-align:right;" |1
| style="text-align:right;" |
| style="text-align:right;" |
| style="text-align:right;" |
| style="text-align:right;" |
|-
| style="text-align:left;" |50PLUS (50+)
| style="text-align:right;" |2
| style="text-align:right;" |2
| style="text-align:right;" |1
| style="text-align:right;" |
| style="text-align:right;" |
| style="text-align:right;" |
| style="text-align:right;" |
| style="text-align:right;" |
|-
| style="text-align:left;" |Political Reformed Party (SGP)
| style="text-align:right;" |2
| style="text-align:right;" |2
| style="text-align:right;" |1
| style="text-align:right;" |2
| style="text-align:right;" |2
| style="text-align:right;" |2
| style="text-align:right;" |2
| style="text-align:right;" |2
|-
| style="text-align:left;" |Independent Senate Group (OSF)
| style="text-align:right;" |1
| style="text-align:right;" |1
| style="text-align:right;" |1
| style="text-align:right;" |1
| style="text-align:right;" |1
| style="text-align:right;" |1
| style="text-align:right;" |1
| style="text-align:right;" |
|-
| style="text-align:left;" |Pim Fortuyn List (LPF)
| style="text-align:right;" |
| style="text-align:right;" |
| style="text-align:right;" |
| style="text-align:right;" |
| style="text-align:right;" |1
| style="text-align:right;" |
| style="text-align:right;" |
| style="text-align:right;" |
|-
| style="text-align:left;" |General Elderly Alliance (AOV)
| style="text-align:right;" |
| style="text-align:right;" |
| style="text-align:right;" |
| style="text-align:right;" |
| style="text-align:right;" |
| style="text-align:right;" |
| style="text-align:right;" |2
| style="text-align:right;" |
|-
|style="text-align:left;background-color:#E9E9E9"|Total 
|width="30" style="text-align:right;background-color:#E9E9E9"|75
|width="30" style="text-align:right;background-color:#E9E9E9"|75
|width="30" style="text-align:right;background-color:#E9E9E9"|75
|width="30" style="text-align:right;background-color:#E9E9E9"|75
|width="30" style="text-align:right;background-color:#E9E9E9"|75
|width="30" style="text-align:right;background-color:#E9E9E9"|75
|width="30" style="text-align:right;background-color:#E9E9E9"|75
|width="30" style="text-align:right;background-color:#E9E9E9"|75
|}* Reformatory Political Federation (RPF) and Reformed Political League (GPV)

See also 
 List of presidents of the Senate (Netherlands)

Notes

References

External links 

  (English)
  (Dutch)

 
States General of the Netherlands
Dutch political institutions
High Councils of State
Netherlands
1815 establishments in the Netherlands
Organisations based in The Hague

tk:Senat (Gollandiýa)